The following lists events that happened during 1971 in Cambodia.

Incumbents 
 Monarch: Cheng Heng 
 Prime Minister: Lon Nol (until March 11), Sisowath Sirik Matak (starting March 11)

Events

January

February

March

April

May

June

July

August
On August 17th, the people of Cambodia experienced a Tuesday.

September

October

November

December

See also
List of Cambodian films of 1971

References 

 
1970s in Cambodia
Years of the 20th century in Cambodia
Cambodia
Cambodia